Collinsville is a rural locality in the Mid North region of South Australia, situated in the Regional Council of Goyder. It was established in August 2000, when boundaries were formalised for the "long established local name". It has almost exactly the same boundaries as the cadastral Hundred of Tomkinson, with small variations on its western border.

The Hundred of Tomkinson was proclaimed on 18 September 1879 by Governor William Jervois, named after politician Samuel Tomkinson. Collinsville Post Office opened on 1 April 1896, named after the property of local grazier John Collins; it closed on 1 December 1917. The state Nomenclature Committee had recommended in 1916 that the post office be renamed 'Metiappa', an abridgement of 'Piltimetiappa', the Aboriginal name for a local creek and the name of another local station, but there is no record of this having occurred before the closure. The Collinsville property developed as a famous merino stud, and upon Collins' death, The Advertiser described his family firm as "among the best studmasters in Australia".

The historic Collinsville Homestead Complex and the Piltimittiappa Homestead are both listed on the South Australian Heritage Register.

Much of the Caroona Creek Conservation Park lies within Collinsville.

References

Towns in South Australia
Mid North (South Australia)